Charles Woolley may refer to:

 Sir Charles Leonard Woolley (1880–1952), British archaeologist
 Charles A. Woolley (1834–1922), Australian photographer
 Charles Woolley (rugby league), New Zealand rugby league international